The California Highway Patrol (CHP) is a state law enforcement agency of the U.S. state of California. The CHP has primary patrol jurisdiction over all California highways and roads and streets outside city limits, and can exercise law enforcement powers anywhere within the state. The California Highway Patrol can assist local and county agencies and can patrol major city streets along with local and county law enforcement, state and interstate highways, and is the primary law enforcement agency in rural parts of the state.

The California State Legislature originally established the California Highway Patrol as a branch of the Division of Motor Vehicles in the Department of Public Works, with legislation signed by Governor C. C. Young on August 14, 1929. It was subsequently established as a separate department with legislation signed by Governor Earl Warren in 1947. The CHP gradually assumed increased responsibility beyond the enforcement of the State Vehicle Act and eventually merged with the smaller California State Police in 1995. It is currently organized as part of the California State Transportation Agency (CALSTA).

In addition to its highway patrol duties, the CHP also provides other services including protecting state buildings and facilities (most notably the California State Capitol) and guarding state officials. The CHP also works with municipal and federal law enforcement agencies, providing assistance in investigations, patrol and other aspects of law enforcement.

The California Highway Patrol is the largest state police agency in the United States, with 11,000 employees, over 7,600 of whom are sworn officers, according to a study in December 2019.

The CHP gained international recognition in the late 1970s to the early 1980s through the broadcast of the TV series CHiPs, which chronicled the adventures of two fictional CHP motorcycle officers and served as technical advisors to the 1950's TV show Highway Patrol.

Duties
The agency is responsible for law enforcement on all California state routes (including all freeways and expressways), U.S. Highways, Interstate Highways and all public roads in unincorporated and incorporated portions of any specific county. Local police or the local sheriff's department having a contract with an incorporated city are primarily responsible for investigating and enforcing traffic laws in incorporated cities, but any peace officer of the CHP can still enforce any state law anywhere within the state, even though the agency's primary mission is related to transportation. Furthermore, CHP officers act as bailiffs for the California Supreme Court and California Court of Appeal, as well as providing security at buildings occupied by the State of California.

CHP officers enforce the California Vehicle Code, pursue fugitives spotted on the highways, and attend to all significant obstructions and accidents within their jurisdiction. They patrol in various vehicles including the 2014 & 2016 Ford Police Interceptor Utility (FPIU - Ford Explorer), 2015 Dodge Charger and in 2015 Chevrolet Tahoes. The main vehicle that the CHP uses to patrol is the Dodge Charger Pursuit in the RWD V6 Police Package. The only Hemi V8 Chargers CHP have are in the EVOC unit used for training purposes. CHP Officers have been using some police cars from the early 2000s such as Ford Expeditions.

CHP officers are responsible for investigating and disposing of car accidents, disabled vehicles, debris, and other impediments to the free flow of traffic. They are often the first responders at the scene of an accident (or obstruction), and in turn summon paramedics, firefighters, tow truck drivers or Caltrans personnel. The CHP files traffic collision reports for state highways and within unincorporated areas. The CHP responds to and investigates all accidents involving school buses throughout the state including incorporated cities.

CHP also has Multidisciplinary Accident Investigation Teams (MAIT) for the investigation of traffic collisions.

Special responsibilities

The CHP also publishes data on traffic accidents in California from a database called SWITRS (Statewide Integrated Traffic Records System).

After the September 11, 2001 attacks the CHP became responsible for securing and patrolling a number of potential terrorist targets in California. These sites include nuclear power plants, government buildings, and key infrastructure sites. The CHP also maintains a SWAT team on 24‑hour stand‑by to respond to any terrorist activity.

In September 2005, the CHP sent its two Mobile Field Forces (highly trained and equipped quick reaction/deployment teams for civil disturbances and/or disasters) to the Gulf Coast to assist in the aftermath of Hurricane Katrina. Before the United States National Guard arrived, the CHP had four patrol helicopters over Marianna, Florida, more than eighty vehicles on the ground, and more than 200 officers and other staff, including a SWAT team, deployed in New Orleans.

The CHP also has officers assigned to drug task forces and other criminal investigative task forces throughout the state, and maintains highly trained Warrant Service Teams (WST) throughout each of its Divisions. These teams serve high-risk felony arrest and search warrants generated as a result of CHP investigations, and the WST assists local, state, and federal law enforcement agencies to serve the same type of high-risk warrants. CHP investigators also work closely with agents of the State Bureau of Investigation, Office of the Attorney General.

Additionally, the CHP has dozens of narcotic patrol and explosive detection K-9 teams stationed throughout the state.

The California Highway Patrol's additional responsibilities includes a governor protection detail.

Somewhat controversially, the cities of Oakland and Stockton have contracted with the California Highway Patrol to assist their police departments with local patrol duties, including traffic stops and responding to 911 calls.

Pay and pensions
Average officer pay was $118,000 in 2014. By law, salaries are set by an average of the five largest police departments in the state. In 2012, the top paid CHP officer received $483,581, 44 other officers earning over $200,000, and over 5,000 officers receiving over $100,000. In 2011, CHP officers earned $82.4 million in overtime, triple the amount in the second largest state, and with one officer earning over $93,000 in overtime alone. Officers are strictly prohibited from working more than 16.5 hours at a time before having to take a minimum 8-hour break.

In 1999, Governor Gray Davis signed SB 400, which allowed CHP officers to retire at age 50 and continue receiving as much as 90% of their peak pay as a pension. This raised the pension earned for 30 years of service from an average of $62,218 to $96,270. Officers' average retirement age is 54. New officers have a retirement age of 57 in accordance with CalPers 2.7% at 57 formula. As of 2019, a new contract was negotiated with the state, causing officers to increase their contribution to the retirement plan by deferring any percentage over 3% of their annual raise towards their pension. This brings their contribution closer to a 50–50 split with the state, while boosting state contributions toward the officers' retirements from other sources.

Organization and accreditation

The CHP is led by the Commissioner, who is appointed by the Governor of California. The Deputy Commissioner is also appointed by the Governor and the Assistant Commissioners are appointed by the Commissioner.

On February 3, 2023, Acting Commissioner Duryee was appointed to Commissioner by Governor Gavin Newsom.

Hierarchy

 Commissioner of the Highway Patrol — Sean A. Duryee (Acting)
 Office of Employee Relations
 Office of Employee Relations
 Deputy Commissioner of the Highway Patrol — Sean A. Duryee
 Office of Inspector General
 Office of Community Outreach & Media Relations
 Office of Legal Affairs
 Office of Internal Affairs
 Office of Risk Management
 Office of Equal Employment Opportunity
 Assistant Commissioner, Field Operations — Ryan Okashima
 Northern Division
 Valley Division
 Golden Gate Division
 Central Division
 Southern Division
 Border Division
 Coastal Division
 Inland Division
 Office of Air Operations
 Protective Services Division
 Capitol Protection Section
 Dignitary Protection Section
 Judicial Protection Section
 Assistant Commissioner, Staff Operations — Brandon Johnson
 Administrative Services Division
 Enforcement and Planning Division
 Information Management Division
 Office of Employee Safety and Assistance
 Personnel and Training Division

On November 20, 2010, the CHP received its initial accreditation under the CALEA Advanced Law Enforcement Accreditation Program. Upon receiving this honor, the CHP became the largest CALEA-accredited law enforcement agency in the nation.

On November 16, 2013, the CHP Academy was formally recognized as an accredited Public Safety Training Academy by CALEA, becoming the first accredited state police training academy in the nation. Additionally, the department succeeded in its bid for Advanced Law Enforcement reaccreditation, and remains the largest accredited law enforcement agency in the nation.

On November 22, 2014, the CHP communications centers were formally accredited by CALEA under the Public Safety Communications Agencies Accreditation Program. Having received this honor, the CHP became the first accredited state highway patrol in the nation to receive communications accreditation.

Having received accreditation status for its communications centers, the CHP became one of only two agencies in California to receive the CALEA TRI-ARC award, which is given to agencies having concurrent CALEA accreditation for their law enforcement, public safety communications and public safety training Academy. The CHP is one of nearly 20 agencies to have received this award.

Rank structure

Traditions
CHP uniforms are traditionally khaki-colored with campaign hat and blue-and-gold trouser stripe. Command officers wear a tan combination cap. The dress uniform includes a forest green jacket and royal blue tie (bow tie for motor officers). Cold weather and utility uniforms are dark blue. Leather gear is black basketweave leather with brass snaps and buckles.

Standard traffic enforcement patrol vehicles are required by state law to have a white door with, in the case of the CHP, a star. The CHP operates traditional black and white as well as all-white patrol vehicles.

The California Highway Patrol is one of the few organizations to continue to use the older toll-free "Zenith 1-2000" number. With the falling cost of telephone area code 800 and 888 numbers, most organizations have chosen to switch to one of the newer numbers and discontinue use of the Zenith service, which requires operator assistance. The CHP's traditions include its own radio codes, widely adopted by local agencies. The most important is 11‑99, which signifies that an officer needs emergency assistance or that an officer is down.

In 1981, a charitable foundation called the 11‑99 Foundation was founded to provide benefits and scholarships to officers and their families. The members of the foundation's board of directors have provided over $16 million in assistance to current, retired, and those fallen in the line of duty CHP employees and their families. The organization's name is taken from the radio code.

Fallen officers

Since its inception in 1929, 227 officers have died in the line of duty. The top three frequent causes of line of duty deaths to date are (in order of cause): Automobile/Motorcycle Accidents, Gunfire, and Vehicular Assault (i.e., struck by drunk driver, reckless driving, or hearing and/or visually impaired drivers). 1964 was the deadliest year, in which eight officers died in the line of duty; 1970 and 1978 were the second deadliest years, in which seven officers died in the line of duty.

Mexico Liaison Unit

The "Mexico Liaison Unit" is a Border Division Unit based in San Diego. Since the CHP has no jurisdiction directly in Mexico, officers from the Unit work closely with Mexican authorities to recover stolen vehicles and assist with other law enforcement issues. The purpose of the "Mexico Liaison Unit" is to develop and maintain positive working relations with Mexican authorities in order to:
 Locate and identify stolen U.S. vehicles taken to Mexico
 Identify vehicle thieves and ensure their prosecution, either in Mexico or California
 Provide assistance to Mexican and U.S. authorities

The unit was originally established in 1958 and only consisted of one officer. It was discontinued in the 1970s, and reestablished in 1980. The unit now consists of one sergeant and six officers, all of whom are fluent in Spanish.

Newhall incident

On April 6, 1970, four California Highway Patrol officers were killed in a 4‑minute shootout in the Newhall region of Southern California. The incident is a landmark in CHP history because of both its emotional impact and the procedural and doctrinal reforms implemented by the CHP in the incident's aftermath.

The shootout occurred in a restaurant parking lot just before midnight. Officers Walt Frago and Roger Gore were alerted by radio of a vehicle carrying someone who brandished a weapon. They spotted the car, fell in behind, called for backup, and began the stop procedure. When the suspects' vehicle came to a halt in the parking lot, the driver was instructed to step out of the vehicle and spread his hands on the hood. Gore approached him and Frago moved to the passenger side. The passenger side door suddenly swung open and the passenger sprung out, firing at Frago, who fell with two shots in his chest. The gunman, later identified as Jack Twinning, then turned and fired once at Gore, who returned fire. In that moment the driver, Bobby Davis, turned and shot Gore twice at close range. Both officers died instantly.

When Officers James Pence and George Alleyn drove in moments later, they could not see suspects or other officers, but both immediately came under fire. Pence put out an 11‑99 call ("officer needs help, emergency") then took cover behind the passenger door. Alleyn grabbed his shotgun, and positioned himself behind the driver-side door. Both officers were mortally wounded in the ensuing exchange, and one suspect was hit.

Suspects Jack Twinning and Bobby Davis escaped, later abandoned their vehicle and then split up. For nine hours, officers blanketed the area searching for the killers. Twinning broke into a house and briefly held a man hostage. Officers used tear gas before storming the house, but Twinning committed suicide with the shotgun he stole from Frago. Davis was captured, stood trial and convicted on four counts of murder. He was sentenced to death, but in 1972, the California Supreme Court declared the death penalty to be cruel and unusual punishment and in 1973, the court commuted his sentence to life in prison.

Of the incident, Ronald Reagan, who was governor of California at the time, said the following words: "If anything worthwhile comes of this tragedy, it should be the realization by every citizen that often the only thing that stands between them and losing everything they hold dear ... is the man wearing a badge."

A follow-up investigation eventually led to a complete revision of procedures during high-risk and felony stops. Firearms procedures have also changed fundamentally due to this incident, and physical methods of arrest have been improved. The police baton and pepper spray have been added to the officer's arsenal, with more in‑depth training in their use.

The 25th anniversary of the Newhall Incident was observed on April 6, 1995, at the present Newhall Area office, where a brick memorial pays tribute to Officers George Alleyn (6290), Walt Frago (6520), Roger Gore (6547) and James Pence (6885). The memorial once stood at the former Newhall office, but was rebuilt at the new site, about one mile (1.6 km) from the scene of the slayings.

Mergers
On July 12, 1995, the California State Police, which was a separate agency, was merged into the CHP, thus greatly expanding the agency's mandate. In addition to safety on the state highway system, it is now responsible for the safety of all elected state officials and all people who work in or are utilizing a state building in California, such as the State Capitol Building in Sacramento.

It has also been discussed to merge the Law Enforcement Division of the California Department of Fish and Wildlife into the California Highway Patrol. By doing so, this may allow for better protection of California's environment and natural resources. The underfunded CDFW Law Enforcement Division has faced low numbers of Game Wardens also known as Wildlife Officers for the last ten years; a similar idea is already in place in Oregon and Alaska, where the Oregon State Police and Alaska State Troopers serve as game wardens under a separate fish and wildlife division within the two departments.

Firearms

The California Highway Patrol currently issues the Smith & Wesson M&P40 pistol, replacing the Smith & Wesson 4006 TSW.

Vehicles

Origins
When motor vehicles in California were first seen as needing legislation, law enforcement agencies began to patrol using motorcycles, cars and trucks. Motorcycle officers in 1920 Fresno, started a group to assist each other and promote road safety – the Joaquin Valley Traffic Officer's Association – led by Harry Wilson who they elected as president. They renamed themselves the California Association of Highway Patrolmen in 1921, and became the California Highway Patrol in 1927 under the auspices of the Department of Motor Vehicles.

Motorcycles

Through the public competitive bidding process, the Harley-Davidson Electraglide motorcycle was selected as the primary enforcement motorcycle for the California Highway Patrol in 2013.

These replacement enforcement motorcycles will replenish the department's aging motorcycle fleet. In a cost-saving move, the CHP previously deferred the purchase of replacement motorcycles and has not purchased enforcement motorcycles since January 14, 2011. As a result, approximately 20 percent of the current fleet has logged 100,000 plus miles – well exceeding the manufacturer's warranty.

CHP's motorcycle program enhances public safety. Motorcycle officers are able to effectively enforce traffic laws in areas in which enforcement by four-wheel vehicles is impractical. Motorcycles can access scenes of accidents and natural disasters more quickly and work commute traffic in way that is unique to the motorcycle. Additionally, motorcycles play a special role in dignitary protection.

The CHP has approximately 415 enforcement motorcycles working the roads throughout California. The CHP purchased 121 of the Harley-Davidson enforcement motorcycles to replace motorcycles that have high mileage or have been damaged in traffic collisions. As of June 2013, approximately 22 percent of the CHP's motorcycle fleet is over 100,000 miles with more than half of those over 125,000 miles. On average, a CHP enforcement motorcycle is driven 14,000 miles per year.

Early motorcycles used included Indian, Harley-Davidson and Henderson manufactured bikes during the 1920s and 30s; though by 1941, the main manufacturers used at the training academy were Harley-Davidson and Indian.

Patrol cars

The Department of General Services is responsible for selecting a vehicle based on price, performance and payload capacity for the CHP. The bid specifications require a pursuit-rated, rear-wheel drive or all-wheel drive that can carry at least 1,500 pounds, the approximate weight of four officers, their equipment, and the police vehicle equipment.

As of July 2013, CHP had not purchased patrol vehicles since January 2011 and their fleet was rapidly aging. On average, CHP patrol vehicles are driven 33,000 miles per year. Half of their 2,153-vehicle fleet had over 100,000 miles as of June 2013. After 100,000 miles, the warranty on CHP vehicles expires, forcing CHP to pay for maintenance costs. In July 2013, the CHP was authorized to purchase up to 751 new vehicles to begin replacing its aging fleet, starting with cars that have the highest mileage.

Through a public, competitive bidding process, the Ford Police Interceptor Utility Vehicle (Explorer) was selected as the new enforcement vehicle for the CHP in 2013. The Ford Police Interceptor Utility Vehicle is All Wheel Drive and powered by a V6, 3.7 Liter engine. It is a Flex Fuel vehicle that can use gasoline or E85 and gets 16 mpg city and 21 mpg highway.

Several Dodge Charger Police Packages were also purchased for testing.

The Ford Crown Victoria Police Interceptor averaged 14 mpg city and 21 mpg highway. The new Ford Police Interceptor Utility Vehicle costs $26,578, which includes a 5-year, 100,000-mile warranty. The department was paying $24,043 for the Ford Crown Victoria Police Interceptors and recently spent hundreds of thousands of dollars per month to maintain all vehicles no longer covered by warranty.
Several vehicles were allocated to public affairs officers and are used for recruiting purposes. An example of these vehicles can be seen at the California State Fair and other venues. The last Crown Victorias were retired in September 2020. CHP also uses Chevrolet Silverados, Dodge Rams (for commercial vehicle enforcement), Ford Expeditions, and Dodge Durangos for their divisions that experience snow frequently or have certain terrain that is inaccessible to sedan-based patrol cars.

In July 2016, it was announced that the CHP would be taking delivery of 516 2016 Dodge Chargers. These cars are hoped to be more reliable than the Ford Police Interceptor Utility Vehicle, which have been plagued with various recalls and breakdowns, most notably, transmission failures.

In 2017, it was announced that the CHP were going to start using Chevrolet Tahoe Police Patrol Vehicles (PPV) for rural and resident posts. This is because of their ability to carry a larger "basic load" of normal issue equipment, equipment that may be only in a few cars, and / or not carried by patrol cars at all, in a more urban setting.

Aircraft

The CHP utilizes both helicopters and fixed-wing aircraft. As of October 2020, the fleet consisted of:

15 Airbus Helicopters (Eurocopter) AS350B3 Squirrels
8 Cessna T206H Turbo Stationairs
7 Gippsaero GA8 TC-320 Airvans
1 Raytheon (Beechcraft) B300 Super King Air

Notable incidents

George Gwaltney
George Gwaltney, a former officer from Barstow, was convicted on May 10, 1984, in federal court for the on‑duty rape and murder of 23-year-old Robin Bishop on January 11, 1982. He had reported finding a dead body off a deserted stretch of interstate 15 the same day he murdered her with his service weapon. Gwaltney was tried twice for this murder at the San Bernardino County Court House. The first trial ended with the jury deadlocked 8–4 and the second 7–5. The district attorney attempted to try Gwaltney a third time, but a Superior court judge dismissed the murder charge. Since Gwaltney was allowed to go free for the first two state trials, the FBI took over the case. The FBI was able to piece together the events leading up to the murder and the on-duty rape of Robin Bishop and interrogating Gwaltney's alibi, Preston Olson and his mother. There was more forensic evidence that the FBI succeeded in getting to build their case against Gwaltney; soon his story started to fall apart. After the six-month investigation by the FBI, George Michael Gwaltney was arrested in Barstow and tried at the US District Court in Los Angeles. He was represented by a public defender who chose not to have Gwaltney testify as he had done in the previous two state trials. He was found guilty of the murder, rape and the deprivation of Robin Bishop's civil rights while on duty. He was the first California Highway Patrol officer to be charged with the indictment of violating the civil rights of Robin Bishop as well as being the first CHP officer known to commit a murder while on duty. Following the conviction, Gwaltney was subsequently sentenced to 90 years in prison, being eligible for parole after serving at least 30 years. Gwaltney died in federal custody from a heart attack in 1997.

Craig Peyer

Craig Peyer, a former officer from Poway, is serving a forty-year prison sentence for the on-duty strangulation and murder of 20-year-old Cara Knott on December 27, 1986. After she was killed, Knott's body was discarded over an abandoned highway bridge. Peyer was convicted of first-degree murder in 1988. Though he has maintained innocence ever since, Peyer has been denied parole consistently. In 2004, the parole board offered Peyer the chance to prove his alleged innocence by providing a DNA sample to compare against a drop of blood found on Cara's shoe, using modern DNA profiling. Peyer declined to provide a sample, nor explain why he declined to do so.

Brad Wheat
Brad Wheat, an off-duty California Highway Patrol Officer got into a dispute with his wife who was sleeping with the owner of a "Get Ripped Nutrition" in Martell in Amador County, California on August 4, 2018. Wheat had a weapon and the store owner was going to call 911 before Wheat shot the owner, his wife, and himself. The owner managed to escape despite his injury and called 911. Wheat's wife and Wheat were killed instantly.

Michael Joslin
Michael Joslin, a former officer from Pioneer was arrested for continuously molesting and raping a 12-year-old girl on August 13, 2018. He was charged with oral copulation with a minor under 14, lewd acts with a child under 14, continuous sexual abuse of a child, penetration with a foreign object and rape. The Amador County Sheriff's Department was tipped off by a local Church pastor after the victim and her mother came forward with the alleged abuse. The Amador County Sheriff's detectives and the department learned that the alleged molestation had been taking place for the past year. Joslin was employed with the California Highway Patrol Amador area office until August 14, when he was removed from the position. From July 1, 2009, until March 2, 2016, he was employed at the San Andreas area office. He started his career at the CHP Academy in West Sacramento on June 18, 2007. Joslin appeared in court and pleaded not guilty to the charges he had against him and was ordered to turn in his firearms. A protective order was imposed on Joslin in court, prohibiting him from contacting the victim in any capacity. He was held at the Amador County Jail.

On March 4, 2019, Joslin plead guilty to one count of sexual penetration by foreign object and one count of rape by force or fear in exchange for the remaining charges being dismissed. On April 16, he was sentenced to a total of 19 years in prison. Joslin will be eligible for parole in 2033.

Pictures

In 2006, two officers forwarded photos taken of Nikki Catsouras, a teenager who died in a motor vehicle accident, to colleagues without authorization. These photos quickly spread on the internet. The family sued and reached a settlement in the case with CHP for $2.37 million in 2012.

Programs
The CHP hosts or partners with numerous programs for public safety education and community involvement.

Youth programs
 Start Smart – a class for prospective and new teen drivers
 Every 15 Minutes – a two-day anti-drunk driving presentation for high school students
 Impact Teen Drivers – a nonprofit against teen distracted driving that is partnered with the CHP
 Make the Right Turn – aimed at educating 11- to 14-year-olds about drugs and peer pressure
 California Highway Patrol Explorer Program – A law enforcement career exploration program for teenagers ages 15–21 years old who are interested in becoming a CHP Officer.
 Sober Graduation – promoting sober driving and the use of a designated driver for teens
 Red Ribbon Week – a week in October dedicated to education about the dangers of illicit drugs for students of all ages

Vehicle Theft Recognition and Awards Program
 10851 Award for Superior Efforts in Vehicle Theft Arrests and Recovery. The CHP developed the 10851 Awards Program to recognize the superior efforts made by CHP and allied law enforcement personnel who have met specified criteria toward the reduction of stolen vehicle crimes. This includes actual arrests made of suspects charged with California Vehicle Code Section 10851 – Vehicle Theft. The CHP, in conjunction with the California State Automobile Association, presented an estimated 2,009 awards in 1995 to the more than 170 allied agencies participating in the 10851 Awards Program.

Other programs
 Highway Safety Corridor Program – promoting caution on roads with high accident rates
 Senior Volunteer Program –  Citizens ages 55 and older can volunteer their time to help the CHP out in their community.
 Designated Driver Program – program to reduce drunk driving incidents through using a designated driver

Origins of the name
When the CHP was formed, there were discussions as to what to call this new agency. The consensus was for the name "California Highway Patrol". The American Automobile Association (AAA) is a private organization which provided, among other things, roadside assistance to their members. At that time, the AAA had a fleet of trucks which patrolled the roads so they could assist their members. These trucks carried a sign which said "Highway Patrol". The CHP organizers decided it would be best to contact the AAA to see if they would object to the state using this name. The AAA considered the idea, and gave their consent.

See also
 Highway patrol
 List of law enforcement agencies in California

References

Further reading
 Crane, Bob, California Association of Highway Patrolmen Golden Chronicle 1920–1970, (Sacramento, California: California Association of Highway Patrolmen, 1970).

External links

 
 CHP Traffic Incident Information Page
 CHP recruitment website
 California Association of Highway Patrolmen (CAHP) website